Spanx, Inc.  is an American underwear maker focusing on shaping briefs and leggings, founded in Atlanta, Georgia. The company manufactures mainly pantyhose and other underwear for women and, since 2010, produces male underwear as well. Spanx specializes in foundation garments intended to make people appear thinner or more shapely.

History

Founding 

Following her graduation from Florida State University (FSU) in 1993, Walt Disney World Resort employee Sara Blakely joined local stationery company Danka to sell fax machines door-to-door. In the heat and humidity of Florida, she tried unsuccessfully to find pantyhose that did not have seamed toes and that did not roll up the leg after she cut them.

Investing her life-savings of $5,000, she moved to Atlanta at age 27, where she researched and developed a hosiery concept predominantly on her own. The creation of the initial product prototype was completed over the course of a year and involved Blakely, her mother, and her friends personally testing the garments. This was innovative at the time, as the industry did not test products with people. Blakely's research revealed that the industry had previously been using the same size waistband for all hosiery products to cut costs, and a rubber cord was inserted into the waistband. For her product development, Blakely created different waistbands to suit different-sized consumers.

Blakely finalized her patent application with a patent attorney prior to her submission to the United States Patent and Trademark Office (USPTO). Following the submission of the online application, Blakely then worked on the packaging of her product, which she intended to color red for the purpose of boldness, as the other brands at the time were all packaged in "beige, white or grey." Additionally, Blakely used three animated images of different-looking women, which was also novel at the time, when other brands displayed the same type of female model.

Requiring a brand name for her product, Blakely was frustrated after failing to settle on a title that satisfied her, after a year and a half of  ideation. At the time she finalized her brand name, Blakely knew that Coca-Cola and Kodak were two of the most recognized brand names in the world, and that both contained a strong "k" sound. Blakely read that the founder of Kodak liked the sound so much that he used it as the beginning and end of his brand name and then proceeded to create a functioning word based upon this foundation. The name "Spanks" eventually came to Blakely, and she decided to replace the "ks" with an "x", as her research had shown that constructed names were more successful and were easier to register as a trademark. Blakely then used her credit card to purchase the "Spanx" trademark on the USPTO website for US$150.

Launch 
In 2000, Blakely launched the Spanx brand from her apartment, undertaking all initial calls and marketing herself. Her boyfriend at the time, a healthcare consultant, later resigned from his job and joined Blakely in the running of the nascent business.

Blakely previously conducted a meeting with a representative of the Neiman Marcus Group, at which she changed into the product in the ladies restroom in the presence of the Neiman Marcus buyer to prove the benefits of her innovation. Blakely's product was sold in seven Neiman Marcus stores as a result of the meeting; Bloomingdales, Saks, and Bergdorf Goodman soon followed.

2000 onwards
Following the establishment of the company, Blakely's then-boyfriend eventually became Spanx's chief operating officer (COO) and met Laurie Ann Goldman at the Saks Fifth Avenue in Atlanta in 2001, while she was on maternity leave from her employer at the time, Coca-Cola. Goldman was specifically looking for a Spanx product, and the pair exchanged contact details—Goldman became the CEO of Spanx in 2002.

Writing for Fortune magazine in February 2014, Colleen Leahey identified Goldman as a key aspect of the company's successful growth:

Goldman crafted a business model for the company based on lessons she learned during her 10-year stint at Coke: thinking big, starting small, and scaling fast. She advised her team at SPANX to focus on product quality over profit margins. “Every time somebody puts on a SPANX product, one of two things can happen: Our brand can get stronger, or our brand can get weaker. We gain leverage or we lose leverage.”

In the first half of 2014, Blakely worked on building the company's first standalone retail stores in shopping malls along the East Coast of the U.S., and also introduced denim to an expanding Spanx product line for the "Fall" range in March.

Goldman resigned from the company in February 2014, after over 10 years at the head of the Spanx. Gregg Ribatt, who had previously worked as an executive for Bennett Footwear, Stuart Weitzman Holdings and Collective Brands' Performance & Lifestyle Group, was appointed as interim chief executive officer. Ribatt's appointment generated discussions about a potential footwear expansion by Spanx according to a statement Blakely made in October 2013 explaining her ambition to design the world's most comfortable high-heel shoe prior to retirement.

In Blakely's June 2014 Forbes profile, the publication claims that the company generates "over $250 million in annual revenues and net profit margins estimated at 20%", while Blakely is very strongly committed to maintaining the private status of Spanx. However, speculation arose about a possible IPO following Goldman's resignation.

In July 2014, Jan Singer, formerly of Nike, joined Spanx as CEO.

In April 2020, Spanx owner Sara Blakely partnered with longtime friend and restaurant owner Justin Anthony to feed frontline workers to fight the coronavirus. Workers at Atlanta's Children's Healthcare and its associated clinics receive free typical South African meals.

It was announced on October 20th, 2021 that Sara Blakely, owner of Spanx, had sold a majority stake in the business to  Blackstone. 
The company was valued at 1.2 billion US dollars. The deal was prepared by an all-female investment team from Blackstone, and it was announced that the Board of Directors would be all-female under Sara Blakely as the Executive Chairwoman.

Products and marketing

Products 

The brand produces lines with names such as "Bod-a-Bing!" and "Hide & Sleek." In 2009, Spanx launched a deluxe collection called "Haute Contour" that included items such as a lace thong with waist reinforcements and color options like pink. Following the release, Blakely explained, "I said, 'Let's make it beautiful ... like shapewear in disguise.'"

Spanx started manufacturing body-shaping undergarments for men ("Spanx for MenMANX") in 2010, and then introduced denim to an expanding Spanx product line for the brand's "Fall" range in March 2014.

Marketing 

During the inception of Spanx, Blakely was contacting friends and acquaintances, including those from her past, and asking them to seek out her products at select department stores in exchange for a check that she would send to them by mail as a token of appreciation. However, Spanx received a marketing boost shortly afterwards, when Oprah Winfrey endorsed the product as one of her "Favorite Things" on her television show in 2000. Prior to officially establishing the company, Blakely had sent a basket of Spanx products to Winfrey's television program, with a gift card that explained what she was attempting to develop, and this garnered Winfrey's attention.

Winfrey's production team explained to Blakely that, while Winfrey usually only promoted the product itself, they sought to travel to Blakely's apartment in Atlanta  and interviewed her in her home, as Winfrey was especially interested by the entrepreneur's story. At the time, Blakely was still a fax machine salesperson and needed to enlist the help of friends to act as employees for the purposes of the filming of the episode.

Other celebrities who wear the brand are Gwyneth Paltrow and Jessica Alba.

Blakely was later caught on CCTV by a department store repositioning her products so they were displayed more prominently.

Corporate affairs

Ownership 
Spanx is a private company and has not released financial information. Forbes estimates its value at $540 million in 2021. Blakely owns the entirety of the brand and employed approximately 100 personnel as of 2011. Goldman was the CEO of Spanx from 2002 to February 2014, when she resigned.

Manufacturing 
In search of a manufacturing partner, Blakely searched ThomasNet to find North Carolina hosiery manufacturers.  Highland Mills in Charlotte, on the recommendation of the CEO’s daughters, ultimately transformed Blakely’s ideas into a prototype sufficient to interest Neiman Marcus.

In 2000, the first year of the company’s existence, Blakely recruited friends to fill orders out of her Atlanta apartment, and generated $8 million in retail sales.  Because Highland had no interest in distribution, Blakely took Spanx production to a small mill in Siler City, which then went out of business.  Acme-McCrary Corporation, a hosiery mill founded in Asheboro, North Carolina, in 1908, then took over production and distribution.   Sales have grown from about $15 million in 2002, when Acme-McCrary began working with Blakely, to more than $400 million in 2014. The North Carolina firm is no longer the sole manufacturer of Spanx, but remains highly involved with Blakely in new product development, yarn specifications and manufacturing expertise.

References

External links

Clothing companies of the United States
Clothing manufacturers
Hosiery brands
Lingerie brands
Manufacturing companies based in Atlanta
American companies established in 2000
Clothing companies established in 2000
2000 establishments in Georgia (U.S. state)